Ray Mitchell Agnew Jr. (born December 9, 1967) is an American football executive and former player who is the assistant general manager for the Detroit Lions of the National Football League (NFL). He served as the director of pro personnel with the Los Angeles Rams from 2017 to 2020.

Agnew played college football as a defensive tackle at NC State and was drafted 10th overall by the New England Patriots in 1990 NFL Draft. He played 11 seasons in the NFL for the Patriots, New York Giants, and St. Louis Rams.

Youth and college football
Agnew was born in Winston-Salem, North Carolina where he attended and played football for Carver High School. During his senior year, he was voted the defensive most valuable player after recording 70 tackles and 10 sacks in only seven games. Agnew then played college football and majored in history at North Carolina State University.

NFL career
He was drafted by the New England Patriots with the 10th pick of the 1st round of the 1990 NFL Draft. Agnew played for the Patriots for five years before going to the New York Giants. After spending three years with the Giants he went to the St. Louis Rams where he played for three years. Agnew retired after the 2000 season.

Executive career
In 2017, Agnew was promoted to director of pro personnel for the Los Angeles Rams. 

On January 27, 2021, Agnew was named the assistant general manager of the Detroit Lions.

Personal life
Three of Agnew's sons are active in the game of football. Ray Agnew III is a pro scout for the New York Jets and is a former fullback in the National Football League.  Agnew's son, Malcolm, is the current running backs coach at Sacramento State, and Keenan is a defensive tackle at Southern Illinois.

References

1967 births
Living people
American football defensive tackles
American football defensive ends
NC State Wolfpack football players
New England Patriots players
New York Giants players
St. Louis Rams players
Los Angeles Rams executives 
Detroit Lions executives
Players of American football from Winston-Salem, North Carolina